Tomás Rojas is a Mexican actor. (born in La Paz, Baja California Sur, Mexico). in France it was part of the Marche et dance workshops, and he also studied construction and handling of mojigangas. He is most recognized for his theater works in Mexico.

Filmography

Film roles

Television roles

References

External links 
 

Mexican male telenovela actors
Mexican male television actors
Mexican male film actors
21st-century Mexican male actors